Key & Peele is an American sketch comedy television series starring Keegan-Michael Key and Jordan Peele, both former cast members of MADtv. Each episode of the series consists of several pre-taped sketches starring the two actors. The sketches cover a variety of societal topics, often with a focus on African-American culture and race relations. The series premiered on January 31, 2012 and ended on September 9, 2015, with a total of 53 episodes, over the course of five seasons. A special entitled "Key & Peele's Super Bowl Special" aired on January 30, 2015.

Series overview

Episodes

Season 1 (2012)

Season 2 (2012)

Season 3 (2013)

Season 4 (2014)
Instead of the typical onstage routine in front of a live audience like in previous seasons, season 4 made use of the clips of a long-running sketch of Key and Peele discussing various topics related to the next sketch while they were driving on a long road in the middle of a desert in between sketches.

Special (2015)

Season 5 (2015)

Ratings

References

Key and Peele